Norberto Mauro da Costa Mulenessa known as Maurito (born June 24, 1981 in Luanda) is an Angolan football striker and winger. He was banned for 5 years from playing football in certain jurisdictions for pushing referee Yuichi Nishimura in a 2008 African Cup of Nations match against Egypt. A teammate and the Angolan team as a whole were also banned from certain areas for 5 years.

National team statistics

International goals
Scores and results list Angola's goal tally first.

References

External links
 CBF
Goalzz.com Player Profile

Living people
1981 births
Angolan footballers
Angolan expatriate footballers
Angola international footballers
2006 Africa Cup of Nations players
2008 Africa Cup of Nations players
Association football midfielders
Atlético Petróleos de Luanda players
Al Jazira Club players
Al Wahda FC players
U.D. Leiria players
Umm Salal SC players
Expatriate footballers in Bahrain
Expatriate footballers in Brazil
Expatriate footballers in Indonesia
Expatriate footballers in Kuwait
Footballers from Luanda
Primeira Liga players
UAE Pro League players
Qatar Stars League players
Angolan expatriate sportspeople in Kuwait
Angolan expatriate sportspeople in Bahrain
Kuwait Premier League players
Kuwait SC players
Al Salmiya SC players
Riffa SC players
Bahraini Premier League players
Angolan expatriate sportspeople in Qatar
Angolan expatriate sportspeople in Indonesia
Angolan expatriate sportspeople in the United Arab Emirates
Angolan expatriate sportspeople in Portugal
Expatriate footballers in Portugal
Expatriate footballers in Qatar
Expatriate footballers in the United Arab Emirates
People from Luanda
PSAP Sigli players